Martin Hurt (born 27 June 1984, in Tartu) is a retired Estonian professional footballer, who last played for JK Tammeka Tartu. He played the position of defender or midfielder.

References

External links
 
 

1984 births
Living people
Sportspeople from Tartu
Estonian footballers
Association football defenders
JK Tervis Pärnu players
FC Warrior Valga players
Viljandi JK Tulevik players
FC Elva players
FC Flora players
Nõmme Kalju FC players
Estonian expatriate footballers
Expatriate footballers in Hungary
Nyíregyháza Spartacus FC players
Tartu JK Tammeka players
Estonian expatriate sportspeople in Hungary